Dhrangadhra State was a princely state during the British Raj. The town of Dhrangadhra served as its capital. It was also known as Halvad-Dhrangadhra State. Halvad once had been the capital of this state. In 1735, Dhrangadhra was founded as its new capital.

History 
The state was founded as Jhalawad in 1090 by rajput ruler Harpal Dev Makwana. The jhala  rajput fought several  battles against muslim invaders and defend his kingdom most famous battle of jhala  rajput was battle of gadarghatta in 1178 jhaleswar raj durjanshalji defeat Mohamad ghuri and accept the surrender of muslim forces and Ghori. In 1742 Dhrangadhra, a new capital, was founded and the state was renamed after it. Among the earlier names were Kuwa and Halwad; the state is still sometimes styled Halwad(-Dhrangadhra). .

Under the British Raj, the colonial Eastern Kathiawar Agency was in charge of Dhrangadhra, which was a salute state entitled to a Hereditary salute of 13-guns.
The state had a population of 100,000 in 1892 on 3,023 Square Kilometers km2. The privy purse was fixed at 380,000 Rupees when it ceased to exist by accession to recently independent India's western state Saurashtra (now in Gujarat) on 15 February 1948.

Rulers

Raj Sahibs of Dhrangadhra 

 Raisinhji II Pratapsinhji,
 Gajsinhji II Raisinhji, Raj Sahib of Dhrangadhra 1744?45 - death 1782,
 Jashwantsinhji II Gajsinhji, born 17.. firstborn of the above, 38th Raja 1782 - death 1801;
 Raniji Jijibai Kunverba - 1758 - 1782
 Raisinhji III Jashwantsinhji, born 1761 son of the above, 39th Raja 1801 - death 1804
 Amarsinhji II Raisinhji, born 1782 firstborn of the above, 40th Raj Sahib 1804 - death 9 April 1843
 Ranmalsinhji Amarsinhji, Raj Sahib 9 April 1843 – death 16 October 1869,
 
 
 Mansinhji II Ranmalsinhji, born 1837, Raja 16 Oct 1869 - 2 Dec 1900 (from 1 Jan 1877)
 2 Dec 1900 - 8 Feb 1911 Ajitsinhji Jashwantsinhji,
 8 Feb 1911 - 1 Jan 1918 Ganshyamsinhji Ajitsinhji (b. 1889 - d. 1942)

Maharaja Shri Raj Sahibs of Dhrangadhra 
 1 Jan 1918 - 4 Feb 1942 Sir Ganshyamsinhji Ajitsinhji (s.a.)
 4 Feb 1942 – 15 August 1947 Mayurdhwajsinhji Meghrajji III (b. 1923 - d. 2010)

See also 
 Jhalawar State

References 

Princely states of Gujarat
Rajput princely states
Kathiawar Agency
Surendranagar district
Rajputs
1742 establishments in India
1948 disestablishments in India